Denis Zmeu (born 8 May 1985) is a former Moldovan footballer who played as a central midfielder.

From 24 August 2015 he is a coach for the physical training of all Moldavian football selections. From February 2016 to June 2017 he is a physical trainer at Milsami Orhei. Since June 2017 he has been a physical trainer at Politehnica Iași, the team for the first time in the 2017–2018 season qualifying in the play-off phase of the first league in Romania.

Club career 

He started his career at Zimbru Chișinău. In the winter of 2007, he was bought by SC Vaslui for about €200,000. In that season he played every single game, but he failed to impress. He scored his first goal for SC Vaslui, in a 3–0 victory against FC Timişoara.

International career 

Soon after his transfer at SC Vaslui, he made his debut in the Moldova national team. He was a regular, until the last year, when, because he failed to play at Vaslui, he lost his place in the national team.

Career statistics

Statistics accurate as of match played 20 December 2011.

International goals
Scores and results list Moldova's goal tally first.

Career honours

SC Vaslui 

 Cupa României
 Runner-up: 2010
UEFA Intertoto Cup
Winner: 2008

References

1985 births
Living people
Footballers from Chișinău
Moldovan footballers
Moldova international footballers
Association football midfielders
Moldovan expatriate footballers
Expatriate footballers in Romania
Liga I players
FC Vaslui players
FC Zimbru Chișinău players